Donald Solitar (September 5, 1932 in Brooklyn, New York, United States – April 28, 2008 in Toronto, Canada) was an American and Canadian mathematician, known for his work in combinatorial group theory. The Baumslag–Solitar groups are named after him and Gilbert Baumslag, after their joint 1962 paper on these groups.

Life
Solitar competed on the mathematics team of Brooklyn Technical High School with his future co-author Abe Karrass, one year ahead of him in school. He graduated from Brooklyn College in 1953 (with the assistance of tutoring from Karrass, who went to New York University) and went to Princeton University for graduate study in mathematics. However, his intended mentor there, Emil Artin, was no longer interested in group theory, so he left with a master's degree and earned his doctorate from New York University instead, in 1958, under the supervision of Wilhelm Magnus.

After finishing his studies, he joined the faculty of Adelphi University in 1959, and Karrass soon joined him there as a doctoral student, earning a Ph.D. under Solitar's supervision in 1961; this was the first Ph.D. awarded at Adelphi. Karrass remained on the faculty with Solitar, where they founded a summer institute for high school mathematics teachers. Solitar moved to Polytechnic University in 1967, and then (as department chair) to York University in 1968, bringing Karrass with him.

Solitar married J. Francien Hageman, a Dutch woman, in 1976. He died of a heart attack on April 28, 2008.

Selected publications
Books
.

Research articles
.
.
.

Awards and honors
Solitar became a Fellow of the Royal Society of Canada in 1982.

References

1932 births
2008 deaths
20th-century American mathematicians
Canadian mathematicians
Fellows of the Royal Society of Canada
Brooklyn College alumni
Princeton University alumni
New York University alumni
Adelphi University faculty
New York University faculty
Academic staff of York University
Mathematicians from New York (state)